Capercaillie Live in Concert is the only live album by folk rock band Capercaillie. It features a recording of the band's performance at celtic Connections in 2002.  It was released by Survival Records and issued in North America by Valley Entertainment.

Track listing
 "Mo Chailin Dìleas Donn"
 "Finlay's"
 "Kepplehall"
"Kepplehall"
"The Osmosis Reel"
 "Níl Sí I nGrá"
 "The Miracle of Being"
 "Dr. MacPhail's Reel/Cape Breton Song"
 "The Weasel Set"
"Granny Hold the Candle While I Save the Chicken's Lips II"
"The Weasel in the Dyke"
"MacLeod's Farewell"
 "Inexile"
 "Iain Ghlinn Cuaich"
 "Bonaparte"
 "The Rob Roy Reels"
"The Road to Rio"
"Bulgarian Red"
"Shetland Reel"
"The Gesto Reel"
"Kiss the Maid Behind the Barrel"
"The Rob Roy Reel"
 "Coisich A Rùin" 
 "Crime of Passion"
 "The Tree"

References

Capercaillie (band) live albums
2002 live albums
Scottish Gaelic music